Herminiocala is a genus of moths in the family Erebidae.

Species
Herminiocala atomosa (Schaus, 1911)
Herminiocala daona (Druce, 1894) 
Herminiocala mimica Köhler, 1979
Herminiocala pallidoides Poole, 1989 (syn: Herminiocala pallida (Schaus, 1911))
Herminiocala sabata Druce, 1894
Herminiocala stigmaphiles (Dyar, 1914)

References
Natural History Museum Lepidoptera genus database

Eulepidotinae
Moth genera